Hemlal Murmu  was a member of the 14th Lok Sabha of India. He represented the Rajmahal constituency of Jharkhand and was a member of the Jharkhand Mukti Morcha (JMM) political party. He is the Bharatiya Janata Party candidate from Rajmahal (Lok Sabha Constituency) in 2019.

External links
 Home Page on the Parliament of India's Website

References

1952 births
Living people
Santali people
People from Godda district
India MPs 2004–2009
Jharkhand Mukti Morcha politicians
Lok Sabha members from Jharkhand
People from Pakur district
People from Sahibganj district
National Democratic Alliance candidates in the 2014 Indian general election
Bharatiya Janata Party politicians from Jharkhand